Yanyuan County is a county in Liangshan Prefecture, Sichuan Province, China, bordering Yunnan province to the west. The county is located in Sichuan's rugged Hengduan Mountains in southwest Sichuan, but the county seat of Yanjing is situated in an unusually flat basin with a  diameter.  Yanjing, as the county seat, is usually referred to as Yanyuan.

History
Yanyuan County was originally inhabited by the Yi people, but has since been incorporated into Han Chinese culture.  The region has long been a source of salt for the Chinese and the name Yanyuan literally means "Salt source".  Until recently, Yanyuan was poorly connected with the rest of China by road.  In the 2010s, a new tunnel was built through the mountains east of Yanyuan to connect the county with the prefecture capital of Xichang.

Geography

In the west, Yanyuan County encompasses the eastern shores of Lugu Lake, shared with Yunnan Province.  To the north and east, Yanyuan is bordered by the Yalong River that cuts a deep gorge through the mountains.  The Yalong forms a dramatic bend as it diverts around the Jinping Mountains in northern Yanyuan.

Yanyuan is composed of the eight towns, 25 townships, and one ethnic township.

Climate

References

Liangshan Yi Autonomous Prefecture
Amdo
County-level divisions of Sichuan